Perry Township is one of thirteen townships in Noble County, Indiana. As of the 2010 census, its population was 6,761 and it contained 2,279 housing units.

Geography

Cities and towns
 Ligonier

Unincorporated towns
 Grismore at 
(This list is based on USGS data and may include former settlements.)

Adjacent townships
 Eden Township, LaGrange County (north)
 Clearspring Township, LaGrange County (northeast)
 Elkhart Township, Noble County (east)
 York Township, Noble County (southeast)
 Sparta Township, Noble County (south)
 Turkey Creek Township, Kosciusko County (southwest)
 Jackson Township, Elkhart County (west)
 Clinton Township, Elkhart County (northwest)

Major highways
  U.S. Route 6
  U.S. Route33
  Indiana State Road 5

References

External links
 Indiana Township Association
 United Township Association of Indiana

Townships in Noble County, Indiana
Townships in Indiana